Lieutenant William Portwood Erwin (18 October 1895 - 19 August 1927) was an American World War I flying ace credited with eight aerial victories. On 19 August 1927, he disappeared during the Dole Air Race from Oakland, California to Hawaii.

Early life
William Portwood Erwin was the son of W. A. Erwin of Chicago. The younger Erwin, born elsewhere, was raised primarily in Chicago. Two sources claim he was born in Amarillo, Texas.

World War I

Erwin was assigned to the 1st Aero Squadron on 19 July 1918. As a Salmson 2A2 pilot, he scored his victories between 15 September and 22 October 1918; half of them were with gunner Arthur Easterbrook.

Postwar

Erwin is believed to have died during the Dole Air Race between Oakland, California and Hawaii. He flew the Dallas Spirit, a custom aircraft built by the Swallow Airplane Company on credit for the attempt. Erwin failed to return from a search for two other missing competitors, the Miss Doran and The Golden Eagle, and is presumed drowned 19 August 1927.

See also

 List of people who disappeared mysteriously at sea
 List of World War I flying aces from the United States

References

Bibliography
 American Aces of World War 1 Harry Dempsey. Osprey Publishing, 2001. , .
 Over the Front: A Complete Record of the Fighter Aces and Units of the United States and French Air Services, 1914–1918 Norman L. R. Franks, Frank W. Bailey. Grub Street, 1992. , .

1895 births
1920s missing person cases
1927 deaths
American World War I flying aces
Aviators from Oklahoma
Aviators killed in aviation accidents or incidents in the United States
Missing aviators
Missing person cases in California
People from Ryan, Oklahoma
People lost at sea
Recipients of the Distinguished Service Cross (United States)
Victims of aviation accidents or incidents in 1927